Smoketown is a neighborhood one mile (1.6 km) southeast of downtown Louisville, Kentucky. Smoketown has been a historically black neighborhood since the Civil War. It is the only neighborhood in the city that has had such a continuous presence. Smoketown is bounded by Broadway, CSX railroad tracks, Kentucky Street, and I-65.

History
The neighborhood's name apparently comes from the large number of (smoke-producing) kilns in the area during its early brick-making days. An 1823 newspaper advertises a brickyard in the area as part of the farm and residence of "the late Mark Lampton", after whom Lampton Street is probably named. 9 of 20 brickyards in the city had Smoketown addresses according to an 1871 Caron's directory, although none remained by 1880, as apparently the supply of clay from under the neighborhood had run out. The abandoned, water-filled clay pits may have given rise to the name "Frogtown" for the neighborhood, which appeared in print in 1880.

Some residential development by whites of German ancestry began in the 1850s, but due to the arrival of thousands of freed slaves who moved there from various parts of rural Kentucky after the Civil War, it was solidly African American by 1870. A streetcar line was extended down Preston Street to Kentucky in 1865, spurring growth.

With its shotgun houses and narrow streets, Smoketown was a densely populated area with a  population of over 15,000 by 1880. African American property ownership was rare, with most living in properties rented from whites.

By the 1960s the area had high crime and unemployment rates, causing massive population loss. Many of the old shotgun houses have been razed and housing projects built in their place. Since the 1950s, Smoketown has been massively depopulated. As of 2000, the population of Smoketown was 2,116, a decrease of over 38% from 1990.

Revitalization

In May 2011, Louisville received a $22 million federal Hope VI award that will allow the demolition of the deteriorating Sheppard Square housing project, replacing it with new, mixed-income housing. In Mayor Fischer's Budget Address of May 26, 2011, he said:
You all heard the exciting news this week about Sheppard Square. The project will have a value of $157 million over the next decade. Our budget includes $1.6 million to help integrate that new development into the surrounding neighborhood. That will not only make the area a better place to live, but will set the table for the private businesses that settle into any healthy neighborhood.

On July 12, 2012, Construction of nine new homes has recently begun near the site of the former Sheppard Square housing development. The nine homes consist of eight in the 500 block of East Breckinridge and one on South Shelby Street.

On December 10, 2012, construction began between Hancock, Jacob, Finzer and Jackson Streets, on a $100 million redevelopment of a new, and revitalized mixed-income Sheppard Square housing neighborhood, with a completion date of December 2015.

Demographics
As of 2000, the population of Smoketown was 2,232, of which 13.1% is white, 81.2% is black, 1.8% is listed as other, and 3.8% is Hispanic. College graduates make up 6.0% of the population, and people without a high school degree make up 42.7%. Females outnumber males 53.4% to 46.6%.

Notable locations
 Albert E. Meyzeek Middle School is located in the neighborhood at 828 S Jackson St.
 Bates Memorial Missionary Baptist Church is located in Smoketown at 620 E Lampton St.
 The Presbyterian Community Center at 701 S Hancock St. was a feature of the Smoketown neighborhood for over 115 years when it closed in 2013. In 2015, Jefferson County Public Schools took over the building to offer Early Head Start programming and renamed the center the Ernest 'Camp' Edwards Education Complex.

References

External links
Nine New Homes in Smoketown Receive National Green Certification—Louisville.gov April 26, 2013
Construction Begins on the New Sheppard Square Redevelopment – Louisville.gov December 10, 2012
New Housing Under Construction Near Sheppard Square Redevelopment—Louisville.gov July 16, 2012
Yarmuth, Fischer Announce $22 Revitalization Effort in Smoketown—Louisville.gov May 23, 2011
Proposal For Smoketown And Beyond -- September 2009
"'Smoketown': Out of sight, out of mind" (Neighborhood Introduction) by Patricia D. McClendon, MSSW - Paper on Smoketown
"Smoketown" (Neighborhood Analysis) by Patricia D. McClendon, MSSW - Paper on Smoketown
"Smoketown" (Organizational Change Strategy) by Patricia D. McClendon, MSSW - Paper on Smoketown
   Images of Smoketown Jackson (Louisville, Ky.) in the University of Louisville Libraries Digital Collections

Neighborhoods in Louisville, Kentucky
Historic districts on the National Register of Historic Places in Kentucky
Populated places established in the 1850s
1850s establishments in Kentucky
National Register of Historic Places in Louisville, Kentucky
African-American history of Kentucky